Valença, also known as Valença do Minho, is a municipality and a town in Portugal. The population in 2011 was 14,127, in an area of 117.13 km2.

Valença officially became a city on 12 June 2009. The municipality is located in Viana do Castelo District. The present Mayor is Jorge Mendes, elected by the Social Democratic Party (PSD). The municipal holiday is 18 February.

Parishes
Administratively, the municipality is divided into 11 civil parishes (freguesias):
 Boivão
 Cerdal
 Fontoura
 Friestas
 Gandra e Taião
 Ganfei
 Gondomil e Sanfins
 São Julião e Silva
 São Pedro da Torre
 Valença, Cristelo Covo e Arão
 Verdoejo

General information
Valença is a walled town located on the left bank of Minho River, approximately 25 km from the Atlantic Ocean. The municipality is limited to the north with Minho River establishing the border with Spain, to south-southeast with the municipality of Paredes de Coura, to southwest with Vila Nova de Cerveira and to the east with Monção.
Linked to the wall rises the new quarter, where buildings such as social facilities, schools, the stadium and sports centre, the health care centre, the municipal market and the municipal swimming pools are located.
Concerning cuisine, Valença offers genuine delicacies such as Lampreia à Minhota (lamprey), Cabrito à Sanfins (kid), Bacalhau à São Teotónio (dried codfish) and Empanada (meat or fish pie).

History
Valença origins date back from Roman times. The two existent Roman roads are the proof (the Via IV of Antonine Itinerary XIX, of military use, and the designated per loca marítima - Itinerary XX -, of commercial use). Also inside the fortified walls a Roman milestone marks the XLII mile of the road connecting Braga to Tui.
This stronghold was populated by order of King Sancho I during the 12th century. It was called Contrasta which means "village opposed to another", Tui (Spain) in this case. King Afonso III changed its name to Valença in the 13th century.
Its historical importance is mainly due to military constraints. It had a decisive role for the defense and integrity of Portugal from the neighbouring Spain.
Today the town is peacefully invaded by the Spanish that visit it with commercial and touristic purposes, the Portuguese still use the fortress.

Attractions

The fortress
The most interesting things to visit are mainly inside the fortress that looks down to the Minho River and Galicia. They have been destroyed several times whether it were the Barbarians, the Moors, the armies of Asturias and Leon or even the French troops in the 19th century, they have always been restored and still very well preserved.
Valença's fortress is a piece of gothic and baroque military architecture. The first walls were built in the 13th century. It was upgraded during the 17th and 18th century forming the present bulwarked system. It is placed on top of two small hills and it is formed by two polygons (the Recinto Magistral and the Coroada) separated by a ditch and with four doors (Coroada, Gaviarra, Fonte da Vila and Sol). The main entrance is Porta do Sol (Sun's door). This door was damaged during the Napoleonic invasions.

The old international bridge
In 1879 Portugal and Spain agreed to construct a bi-functional (road and train) bridge. The bridge was inspired by Eiffel works. The bridge is still in use although a new bridge was built south of the older one.

Roman milestone
Located inside the fortress this Roman milestone dates back from the 1st century AD. It has the following inscription:
TIBERIUS CLAUDIUS CAESER AUGUSTUS GERMANICUS PONTIFEX MAXIMUS. IMPERATOR V CONSUL III, TRIBUNICIA POTESTATE III. PATER PATRIAE BRACARA XLII.
It marks 42 Roman miles' (62 km) distance on the road from Braga to Tui and the Emperor Claudius ordered its construction when the Via IV of Antonine was rebuilt.

Church of Saint Stephen
A romanic church built during the 13th century and a neo-classic rebuilt during the 18th century. Inside several panels representing scenes Saint Stephen life can be admired.

Church of Saint Mary of Angels
Romanic church built during the 12th century. The popular decoration and the ceiling are the eye-catcher.

The cannons
Along the north wall several old cannons very well maintained are positioned pointing to the river and Galicia as if to remind of their old purpose.

Statue of São Teotónio
São Teotónio was the first Portuguese saint. Born near Valença, in Ganfei, he was the confessor of King Afonso Henriques. He is the village patron saint.

Photo gallery

Notable people 
 Theotonius of Coimbra  (ca.1082 - 1162) (São Teotónio) a Canon Regular, royal advisor and the first Portuguese saint.
 Francisco Xavier da Silva Pereira, 1st Count of Antas (1793–1852) a nobleman and a soldier during the Liberal Wars.
 António Sampaio da Nóvoa (born 1954) an academic professor and unsuccessful independent candidate in the 2016 Portuguese presidential election.
 Inês Fernandes (born 1988) a Portuguese Paralympic athlete

References

External links

Municipality official website
Pousada Valença do Minho
Casa do Poço Palace
Quinta Grande Raposeira
Escola Secundária de Valença (Valença High School) - Website in Portuguese
Parque Empresarial de Valença - Website in Portuguese
Valença Radio 91.7 - Website in Portuguese
A V Minho Bus Company- Local buses and buses to Porto
Autna Bus Company- Buses to and from Vigo (Spain).

 
Towns in Portugal
Municipalities of Viana do Castelo District
Portugal–Spain border crossings